Diana Frances or Diana Francis may refer to:

 Diana Frances Spencer (1961–1997), better known as Diana, Princess of Wales
 Diane de France (1538–1619), daughter of French king Henry II
 Diana Frances (comedian) (fl. 1990s–2020s), Canadian comedian, writer, and business manager
 Diana Francis (peace activist) (born 1944), British peace activist and scholar
 Diana Pharaoh Francis (born c. 1967), American professor and fantasy novelist
 Diane Francis (born 1946), Canadian journalist
 Diane Francis (athlete) (born 1968), Saint Kitts and Nevis sprinter